Delaware's 15th Senate district is one of twenty-one districts in the Delaware Senate. It has been represented by Republican Dave Lawson since 2011.

Geography
District 15 covers much of Kent County to the west of Dover, including Cheswold, Felton, Kenton, Marydel, Hartly, Willow Grove, Petersburg, Sandtown, and part of Viola. It borders the state of Maryland.

Like all districts in the state, the 15th Senate district is located entirely within Delaware's at-large congressional district. It overlaps with the 11th, 28th, 29th, 30th, and 33rd districts of the Delaware House of Representatives.

Recent election results
Delaware Senators are elected to staggered four-year terms. Under normal circumstances, the 15th district holds elections in presidential years, except immediately after redistricting, when all seats are up for election regardless of usual cycle.

2020

2016

2012

Federal and statewide results in District 15

References 

15
Kent County, Delaware